The Richard L. Cawood Residence was built in 1923 by Richard Cawood in East Liverpool, Ohio. Cawood was the president of Patterson foundry and owned a steel mill. He had an intense interest in architecture and design and often designed smaller houses.

The design of the house evolved over ten years. Cawood included a tower, chapel, and Porte-cochère. The house is an example of Italian Renaissance architecture combined with Spanish eclectic additions.

The house was added to the National Register of Historic Places in January 1988.

References

Houses completed in 1923
East Liverpool, Ohio
Italianate architecture in Ohio
Houses on the National Register of Historic Places in Ohio
National Register of Historic Places in Columbiana County, Ohio
Houses in Columbiana County, Ohio